Sri Madhopur Assembly constituency is one of constituencies of Rajasthan Legislative Assembly in the Sikar (Lok Sabha constituency).

Sri Madhopur constituency covers all voters from parts of Sri Madhopur tehsil, which include ILRC Mau, ILRC Ajitgarh, Sri Madhopur Municipal Board, Sri Madhopur Rural, Hanspur, Kotri Shimarla and Jorawar Nagar of ILRC Sri Madhopur; and part of Neem Ka Thana tehsil, which includes ILRC Sanwalpura Tanwaran.

References

See also 
 Member of the Legislative Assembly (India)

Sikar district
Assembly constituencies of Rajasthan